Pandoraea is a genus of Gram-negative, non-spore-forming, motile bacteria with a single polar flagellum, of the family Burkholderiaceae and class Betaproteobacteria.

References

Burkholderiaceae
Bacteria genera